Hagendorf may refer to:

Places 
 Hagendorf, part of Traitsching, Bavaria, Germany
 Hagendorf, part of Waidhaus, Bavaria, Germany
 Hagendorf, part of Zerbst-Nedlitz,  Saxony-Anhalt, Germany
 Hagendorf, part of Fallbach, Austria
 Hägendorf in Switzerland

People with the surname 
 Peter Hagendorf, German mercenary in the Thirty Years' War and diarist